Anamanaguchi is an American chiptune-based pop and rock band from New York City. The band has four members: lead songwriters and guitarists Peter Berkman and Ary Warnaar, bassist James DeVito, and drummer Luke Silas.

Anamanaguchi combines digital electronic sounds such as those seen in chiptune and bitpop with traditional band instrumentation. As with other chiptune artists, they have created music using video game hardware from the mid- to late 1980s: namely a NES and a Game Boy.

The origin of the band's name is unclear. In one interview, Berkman said the name "Anamanaguchi" came about from a member in one of his former bands pronouncing gibberish in the style of Jabba the Hutt. On several other occasions, the band has explained that their name came about after the members worked as interns at Armani (Berkman and DeVito), Prada (Warnaar), and Gucci (Silas) while studying fashion at Parsons School of Design (though three of the four majored in Music Technology at New York University). People began calling them the "Armani-Prada-Gucci boys," which eventually was elided into "Anamanaguchi."

Career

2006–2009: Power Supply and Dawn Metropolis 

The band formed in Chappaqua, NY where Peter Berkman & James DeVito were classmates. The band first performed on January 29, 2006 at Cake Shop and through events such as Pulsewave NYC they formed a relationship with the netlabel 8bitpeoples and subsequently released their debut the EP Power Supply in August 2006. The track "Helix Nebula" was featured as the theme song of the former GamesRadar podcast TalkRadar.

Peter Berkman met Ary Warnaar at New York University where they were studying Music Technology. In 2009, Ary Warnaar and Luke Silas joined the band for the release of their following EP, Dawn Metropolis. The album was released with an accompanying website that included animated videos for each of the songs, done in collaboration with artists David Mauro and Paris Treantafeles.

A song from Dawn Metropolis titled "Jetpack Blues, Sunset Hues" is the theme to Chris Hardwick's The Nerdist Podcast. On November 26, 2013, Anamanaguchi appeared as guests on the podcast itself.

2010–2012: Scott Pilgrim vs. the World and summer singles 

In 2010, Anamanaguchi were approached by Ubisoft to compose music for the video game adaptation of the Scott Pilgrim graphic novels, Scott Pilgrim vs. the World: The Game. The soundtrack for the game was released on Amazon and iTunes by ABKCO Records on August 24, 2010. The soundtrack debuted at No. 3 on Billboard's Heatseekers chart (aka Soundscan's New Artist Chart). In the summer of 2010, Anamanaguchi began releasing a series of singles for free download on their website. These singles were released with animated gif cover art (featuring collaborations with artists such as Paul Robertson and Ryder Ripps) and were printed as limited 7" vinyl with lenticular artwork to mimic the animated images.

2013–2015: Endless Fantasy 

On May 3, 2013, Anamanaguchi launched a Kickstarter project for their album Endless Fantasy. In just 11 hours, their funding goal of $50,000 was reached. At the end of its run, the project was backed by 7,253 people who contributed to raising a grand total of $277,399, making it the second most-successful music project to be funded on Kickstarter at the time, behind that of singer Amanda Palmer.

Anamanaguchi featured on Late Night with Jimmy Fallon on June 17, 2013, where they played their song "Endless Fantasy" from the album of the same name. On June 19, 2014, they released a single titled "Pop It" featuring a then-unknown singer whose face was hidden from view. The song was a stylistic departure for the group in that it did not feature any chiptune elements nor traditional band instrumentation, with a lead vocal. Entertainment Weekly described the song as having "glitchy electronic flourishes and relentlessly bubble gummy vibe", also drawing comparisons to Kyary Pamyu Pamyu. In September, the song was featured in a Target TV advertisement, and in mid-2015 was also featured in a Taco Bell commercial for iced beverages. On November 24, 2014, the singer's name, "Meesh彡☆", and her face were revealed to the public.

On November 21, 2014, Anamanaguchi revealed they had been working on a new album titled [USA], which was set to release sometime in 2016. The band also stated that the album would not be a chiptune album. This album was later delayed for an undisclosed amount of time.

2016–present: Capsule Silence XXIV and [USA] 

On March 28, 2016, the band released a role-playing first-person shooter video game called Capsule Silence XXIV which was designed by Ben Esposito along with Anamanaguchi, alongside an original score containing over 30 songs. The band "leaked" the game for free online after staging a hoax Twitter dispute with the game's fictional developer, NHX. The game also contains an unreleased video for "Japan Air", among other hidden Easter eggs. In May 2016, the band was the opening act at the North American Miku Expo tour, finishing at a two-show event at the Hammerstein Ballroom in New York City.  The band returned to the stage each night and performed their single "Miku" live with Hatsune Miku for her encore. The official soundtrack of Capsule Silence XXIV was released in two parts as Capsule Silence XXIV (Original Soundtrack Vol I) on December 21, 2016, and Capsule Silence XXIV (Original Soundtrack Vol II) on October 13, 2017.

On October 19, 2017, the band announced that they would be debuting music from their third studio album, [USA], at a live show on November 10 in Brooklyn, NY. The performance was live streamed on the band's official Twitch page.

On October 18, 2018, Anamanaguchi headlined "Coalchella", a virtual music festival conducted entirely in a Minecraft server with sets broadcast live on an online radio. On January 12 the following year, Anamanaguchi headlined Fire Festival, another Minecraft music festival by Open Pit Presents, the organizers of Coalchella. Anamanaguchi also headlined Open Pit's third festival, MineGala, on September 14, 2019.

In a YouTube video released on August 20, 2019, Anamanaguchi stated that the release date of [USA] would be October 25. It released on the label Polyvinyl Records. Later they announced that the "[USA] tour originally planned for 2020 will be re-scheduled to 2021 due to the COVID-19 pandemic".

On November 12, 2021, the band announced the Scott Pilgrim vs the World: The Game Soundtrack: The Tour, taking place in January the following year. Four days later, they released the song "Water Resistant" featuring 8485 on the label Monstercat in celebration of the then-upcoming mobile game, Rocket League: Sideswipe. On the 30th, later the same month, the band released another song titled "Dreams" with Flux Pavilion for Rocket League: Sideswipe, with the game's official soundtrack releasing shortly after, including both "Dreams" and "Water Resistant". During their Scott Pilgrim vs the World tour, they played a cover of the song "Hopes and Dreams" from the 2015 video game Undertale. They uploaded the cover to their YouTube channel on January 21, 2022.

Musical style and influences 
Stylistically, Anamanaguchi is characterized as electronic, pop, rock, bitpop, chiptune, punk rock, indie rock, electronic rock and electropop.

Berkman has stated that their music is not solely influenced by video game music and that much of it is inspired by "[s]imple pop stuff, like Weezer and the Beach Boys," as well as Janet Jackson, Yasutaka Nakata, Koji Kondo, Elliott Smith and DragonForce.

Berkman stated that his top three influences in order would be "Tim & Eric and that absurd comedy, Japanese music and video games." "Ultimately, Berkman's interest in Japanese pop culture is at the root of his interest in video games."

Anamanaguchi has collaborated with several musical artists including Hatsune Miku, Meesh, and Pochi.

Discography

Studio albums

Extended plays

Singles

Soundtracks

Live bootlegs 

 Knitting Factory, Brooklyn, NY, USA (2011)
 Daytrotter Session (2011)
 Music Hall of Williamsburg, Brooklyn, NY, USA (2011)

Compilation albums 

 Frug 4 Lyfe (2011)
 Single + Remix Collections. The album was released exclusively in Japan on March 4, 2012. The album compiles all of the singles from the band's summer of singles along with all the tracks from Power Supply. As well as these tracks, it includes two previously unreleased remixes of Anamanaguchi tracks.

Remixes

Music videos

Filmography

Television

References

External links 

 
 
 
 Anamanaguchi on YouTube
 Anamanaguchi on Twitter
 Anamanaguchi on Bandcamp

8bitpeoples artists
American pop music groups
Chiptune musical groups
Electronic music groups from New York (state)
Musical groups established in 2004
Musical quartets
Tracker musicians
Punk rock groups from New York (state)
Indie rock musical groups from New York (state)
American electronic rock musical groups
Electropop groups
Monstercat artists
Alcopop! Records artists